The Diocese of Lexington is a Latin Church ecclesiastical territory or diocese in the United States. Comprising southeastern Kentucky, it was erected on January 14, 1988. The diocese is a suffragan in the ecclesiastical province of the metropolitan Archdiocese of Louisville. The Diocese of Lexington provides education for approximately 4300 students in its fifteen elementary and two high schools located throughout the diocese, and maintains Newman Centers at eight of Kentucky's colleges and universities.

History
Pope John Paul II established the Diocese of Lexington on January 14, 1988, from 43 counties previously of the Diocese of Covington and 7 counties previously of the Archdiocese of Louisville.  The formal ceremony establishing the diocese and installing its first bishop, James Kendrick Williams, took place on March 2, 1988, at Christ the King Church.  With the establishment of the diocese, and the installation of its bishop, Christ the King Church was elevated to the status of cathedral.

Sexual abuse incidents
On August 14, 2020, the Diocese of Lexington released a list of 20 priests who served within the jurisdiction of the Diocese of Lexington and were found to have committed acts of sex abuse. In his letter, which was released with the list, Lexington Bishop John Stowe wrote that 10 allegations were "substantiated", four allegations were "credible", and that the remaining six allegations were credible but involved minors outside the Diocese of Lexington. Just two of these allegations were reported after the erection of the Diocese of Lexington in 1988.

Bishops

Bishops of Lexington
 James Kendrick Williams (1988-2002)
 Ronald William Gainer (2002-2014), appointed Bishop of Harrisburg
 John Eric Stowe, OFM Conv. (2015–present)

Coat Arms

High schools
 Lexington Catholic High School, Lexington
 The Piarist School, Martin

See also

 Catholic Church by country
 Catholic Church hierarchy
 List of the Catholic dioceses of the United States

References

External links 
Roman Catholic Diocese of Lexington Official Site

 
Christian organizations established in 1988
Catholic Church in Kentucky
Lexington
Lexington
Roman Catholic Ecclesiastical Province of Louisville